"Pretty Girl Bullshit" (a title appearing censored on the clean versions of albums and in some reviews as "Pretty Girl Bullsh*t") is a R&B and rap song written and performed by Mario Winans and Foxy Brown (in the writing credit Brown uses her real name, Inga Marchand). The song first appeared in 2003 on Bad Boys II, the soundtrack to the film of the same name. In 2004 it appeared on Hurt No More, Winans' second album.

The voice of Sean Combs (the executive producer of the Bad Boys II soundtrack) can be heard in the song interjecting short phrases such as "yeah, yeah! Let's go."

Content
The song is arranged as a sort of dialogue that indicates that Brown's character is the pretty girl whose "bullshit" troubles Winans.  Unlike those delivered by Brown, the lyrics sung by Winans do not include profanity; "Take your pretty girl bull" is his harshest phrase.

Brown's rap takes the narrative position of chiding Winans for infidelity and, in particular, for his generosity to other women.  She complains that he has "had a hoe rockin' my red gold Cartier on her wrist" and "y'all don't want a girl in Yves Saint Laurent, You'd rather fuck a hoe in a bullshit Gabann'".  Characteristically, Brown also makes various boasts which include namechecking Sean Combs, saying that "I'm in Caprice" (perhaps referring to Capri), and bragging "I'm a Bad girl, illest bitch grinding...Sean John Rolls hold chocolate diamonds..."

Winans, in contrast, delivers far less aggressive lyrics in his characteristic R&B style.  In the song's intro he sings "I can't live with you" several times.  As the song progresses, he expresses doubts about their compatibility singing "What am I to do, when you act a fool" and "What you had in me, too fine to see."  By the middle of the song, he is explicitly dismissive of his partner's "pretty girl bull" and sings "...if you wanna go, walk right out that door...If you wanna leave, it's okay with me...Matter of fact I'm begging please."

All three artists add various phrases ad libitum, particularly in the last two choruses.

Reviews
In a generally good review of Hurt No More, a reviewer for Allmusic spoke negatively about this song saying:
Winans doesn't wear the few occurrences of harder-edged material so well -- "Pretty Girl Bullsh*t," featuring an ill-matched verse from Foxy Brown, is particularly out of character and disrupts the lush, sensual flow of the record. A couple minor blunders like that hardly prevent Hurt No More from being one of the finest R&B albums of the year.
Independent reviewers of the Bad Boys II soundtrack on Amazon.com conveyed an equally negative reaction.  One called it "another mistake".  Another opined that the song "falls under skip material for me."  A review for musicOMH.com criticizes the song saying it is...
..an awkward listen with clear West Coast allusions in the beat, which feels completely wrong in the context and delivery of the track.

Another review of Bad Boys II complains: 
By the time we get to the rather worryingly title Pretty Girl Bullshit by Marion [sic] Winans and Foxy Brown things are getting rather tired. PGB seems to be about Winans going on about how much he dislikes people like Foxy Brown. That could be wishful thinking though - on my part.

On the other hand, in reviewing Hurt No More Rolling Stone said "Winans nails all the emo cues...[for example] resentment on "Pretty Girl Bullsh*t".  The UK website CD Times only comment was that "Pretty Girl Bullshit and This Is The Thanks I Get give the record an edge."

References

2004 songs
Foxy Brown (rapper) songs
American hip hop songs
Rhythm and blues songs
Songs written by Mario Winans
Songs written by Foxy Brown (rapper)
Bad Boys (franchise)